Workers Association of Malmfälten (in Swedish: Malmfältens Arbetarförening) was a political group in Gällivare, Sweden. MAF was founded in 1985, ahead of the municipal elections. It won one seat in the municipal council of Gällivare. MAF had launched a list with 21 LO members.

At its peak MAF had around 220 members.

A major part of the founders of the organization belonged to the Program Tendency within the Socialist League (SF). However, that group left SF to form the International Group.

On January 10, 1988 MAF, IG and the Solidarity Party formed the United Socialists as a coalition.

MAF was dissolved in 1990, and the remaining members entered the Workers List.

Political parties established in 1985
Defunct socialist parties in Sweden
1985 establishments in Sweden
Political parties disestablished in 1990
1990 disestablishments in Sweden